North Toowoomba is an urban locality in Toowoomba in the Toowoomba Region, Queensland, Australia.

Geography
North Toowoomba is located directly north of the Toowoomba city centre.

History
Toowoomba North Boys State School and Toowoomba North Girls and Infants State School both opened in 1869. In 1937 the two schools were combined to form Toowoomba North State School. However, despite the name, the school is  officially within Toowoomba City rather than in North Toowoomba.

St Thomas' Anglican Church was dedicated on 21 December 1920 by Archdeacon Osborn. The church building had been relocated from Ruthven Street near the railway line where it was no longer needed to 2 Allan Street (corner of Jellicoe Street ,). The church's closure on 3 February 2008 was approved by Assistant Bishop Nolan. It has been converted into a private home.

In the 2006 census, North Toowoomba had a population of 3,062 people.

In the 2011 census, North Toowoomba had a population of 3,049 people.

Heritage listings 
There are a number of heritage-listed sites in North Toowoomba, including:
 57 Brook Street: The Downs Co-operative Dairy Association Limited Factory

Education 
Toowoomba North State School is a government co-education primary (P-6) school, located on the south-west corner of Mort and Taylor Streets. In 2015, the school had an enrolment of 157 students with 12 teachers (11 full-time equivalent). However, despite the name, the school is  officially within Toowoomba City rather than in North Toowoomba.

References

External links 

 

Suburbs of Toowoomba
Localities in Queensland